The 1920–21 Montreal Canadiens season was the team's 12th season and fourth as a member of the National Hockey League (NHL). The Canadiens, for the second season in a row, did not qualify for the playoffs, finishing third in the first half and second in the second half of the season.

The team saw some turnover from the previous season's team. Harry Cameron, Billy Coutu, Jack Coughlin, Howard McNamara and Don Smith were gone. In their place was Billy Bell, Dave Campbell, Jack McDonald, Harry Mummery, Dave Ritchie and  Cully Wilson. Coutu was traded to the new Hamilton Tigers for Mummery. Cameron returned to Toronto and picked up Wilson. McDonald and Ritchie were picked up as free agents while Campbell was a new professional from the Laval University ranks and would only play in three games.

Regular season

Georges Vezina came third in the league in goals against average of 4.1 per game. Newsy Lalonde led the Canadiens in offence, scoring 32 goals and 10 assists to win the league scoring championship.

Final standings

Record vs. opponents

Schedule and results

Player statistics

Note: Pos = Position; GP = Games played; G = Goals; A = Assists; Pts = Points; PIM = Penalty minutes         MIN = Minutes played; W = Wins; L = Losses; T = Ties; GA = Goals-against; GAA = Goals-against average; SO = Shutouts;          † = spent time with another team before joining Canadiens, stats reflect time with the Canadiens only;         ‡ = loaned to another team, stats reflect time with the Canadiens only;

Playoffs

The Canadiens did not qualify for the playoffs

Transactions
traded Harry Cameron to Toronto St. Pats for cash, November 27, 1920 
acquired Jack McDonald, Harry Mummery and Dave Ritchie from Hamilton Tigers for Jack Coughlin and the loan of Billy Coutu, November 29, 1920
Cully Wilson loaned for season from Toronto St. Pats, January 21, 1921
returned Cully Wilson to Toronto St. Pats, February 11, 1921
loaned Jack McDonald to Toronto St. Pats for the rest of the season, February 11, 1921
signed Dave Campbell as a free agent, February 26, 1921

See also
 1920–21 NHL season

References

 

Montreal Canadiens seasons
Montreal
Montreal